The 2006–07 NBL season was the 29th season of competition since its establishment in 1979. For the first time, a team was established from outside the Australasian area, with the Singapore Slingers taking over the licence of the Hunter Pirates. A new franchise, the South Dragons, was established in Melbourne, taking the number of teams to twelve.

The Brisbane Bullets established a new NBL record of 21 straight wins, including 18 in the regular season.

2006–07 league participants

Stadiums and locations

Pre-Season Blitz
The Blitz, which is the official pre-season tournament of the Philips Championship, was held in Coffs Harbour on the Mid North Coast of New South Wales from 8–10 September and featured all 12 NBL teams including the Dragons and Slingers, who were on show for the first time.

Blitz Group stage
 The top four teams of each pool qualify for quarter-finals.

Pre-Season Blitz finals series

Pre-Season Blitz Awards

Most Valuable Player

C. J. Bruton (Brisbane Bullets)

All-Star Five

C. J. Bruton (Brisbane Bullets)

Cortez Groves (Wollongong Hawks)

Nick Horvath (Adelaide 36ers)

Sam Mackinnon (Brisbane Bullets)

Darryl McDonald (Melbourne Tigers)

Regular season

The 2006-07 Regular Season will take place over 21 Rounds between 20 September 2006 and 11 February 2007.

Round 1

|- bgcolor="#CCCCFF" font size=1
!width=90| Date
!width=180| Home
!width=60| Score
!width=180| Away
!width=260| Venue
!width=70| Crowd
!width=70| Boxscore

Round 2

|- bgcolor="#CCCCFF" font size=1
!width=90| Date
!width=180| Home
!width=60| Score
!width=180| Away
!width=260| Venue
!width=70| Crowd
!width=70| Boxscore

Round 3

|- bgcolor="#CCCCFF" font size=1
!width=90| Date
!width=180| Home
!width=60| Score
!width=180| Away
!width=260| Venue
!width=70| Crowd
!width=70| Boxscore

Round 4

|- bgcolor="#CCCCFF" font size=1
!width=90| Date
!width=180| Home
!width=60| Score
!width=180| Away
!width=260| Venue
!width=70| Crowd
!width=70| Boxscore

Round 5

|- bgcolor="#CCCCFF" font size=1
!width=90| Date
!width=180| Home
!width=60| Score
!width=180| Away
!width=260| Venue
!width=70| Crowd
!width=70| Boxscore

Round 6

|- bgcolor="#CCCCFF" font size=1
!width=90| Date
!width=180| Home
!width=60| Score
!width=180| Away
!width=260| Venue
!width=70| Crowd
!width=70| Boxscore

Round 7

|- bgcolor="#CCCCFF" font size=1
!width=90| Date
!width=180| Home
!width=60| Score
!width=180| Away
!width=260| Venue
!width=70| Crowd
!width=70| Boxscore

Round 8

|- bgcolor="#CCCCFF" font size=1
!width=90| Date
!width=180| Home
!width=60| Score
!width=180| Away
!width=260| Venue
!width=70| Crowd
!width=70| Boxscore

Round 9

|- bgcolor="#CCCCFF" font size=1
!width=90| Date
!width=180| Home
!width=60| Score
!width=180| Away
!width=260| Venue
!width=70| Crowd
!width=70| Boxscore

Round 10

|- bgcolor="#CCCCFF" font size=1
!width=90| Date
!width=180| Home
!width=60| Score
!width=180| Away
!width=260| Venue
!width=70| Crowd
!width=70| Boxscore

Round 11

|- bgcolor="#CCCCFF" font size=1
!width=90| Date
!width=180| Home
!width=60| Score
!width=180| Away
!width=260| Venue
!width=70| Crowd
!width=70| Boxscore

Round 12

|- bgcolor="#CCCCFF" font size=1
!width=90| Date
!width=180| Home
!width=60| Score
!width=180| Away
!width=260| Venue
!width=70| Crowd
!width=70| Boxscore

Round 13

|- bgcolor="#CCCCFF" font size=1
!width=90| Date
!width=180| Home
!width=60| Score
!width=180| Away
!width=260| Venue
!width=70| Crowd
!width=70| Boxscore

Round 14

|- bgcolor="#CCCCFF" font size=1
!width=90| Date
!width=180| Home
!width=60| Score
!width=180| Away
!width=260| Venue
!width=70| Crowd
!width=70| Boxscore

Round 15

|- bgcolor="#CCCCFF" font size=1
!width=90| Date
!width=180| Home
!width=60| Score
!width=180| Away
!width=260| Venue
!width=70| Crowd
!width=70| Boxscore

Round 16

|- bgcolor="#CCCCFF" font size=1
!width=90| Date
!width=180| Home
!width=60| Score
!width=180| Away
!width=260| Venue
!width=70| Crowd
!width=70| Boxscore

Round 17

|- bgcolor="#CCCCFF" font size=1
!width=90| Date
!width=180| Home
!width=60| Score
!width=180| Away
!width=260| Venue
!width=70| Crowd
!width=70| Boxscore

Round 18

|- bgcolor="#CCCCFF" font size=1
!width=90| Date
!width=180| Home
!width=60| Score
!width=180| Away
!width=260| Venue
!width=70| Crowd
!width=70| Boxscore

Round 19

|- bgcolor="#CCCCFF" font size=1
!width=90| Date
!width=180| Home
!width=60| Score
!width=180| Away
!width=260| Venue
!width=70| Crowd
!width=70| Boxscore

Round 20

|- bgcolor="#CCCCFF" font size=1
!width=90| Date
!width=180| Home
!width=60| Score
!width=180| Away
!width=260| Venue
!width=70| Crowd
!width=70| Boxscore

Round 21

|- bgcolor="#CCCCFF" font size=1
!width=90| Date
!width=180| Home
!width=60| Score
!width=180| Away
!width=260| Venue
!width=70| Crowd
!width=70| Boxscore

Ladder

The NBL tie-breaker system as outlined in the NBL Rules and Regulations states that in the case of an identical win–loss record, the results in games played between the teams will determine order of seeding.

13-way Head-to-Head between Wollongong Hawks (4-2), New Zealand Breakers (4-2) and Adelaide 36ers (1-5). 

2Wollongong Hawks won Head-to-Head (2-1).

Finals

Playoff bracket

Elimination Finals

|- bgcolor="#CCCCFF" font size=1
!width=90| Date
!width=180| Home
!width=60| Score
!width=180| Away
!width=260| Venue
!width=70| Crowd
!width=70| Boxscore

Semi-finals

|- bgcolor="#CCCCFF" font size=1
!width=90| Date
!width=180| Home
!width=60| Score
!width=180| Away
!width=260| Venue
!width=70| Crowd
!width=70| Boxscore

Grand Final

|- style="background:#ccf; font-size:0.8em;"
|- bgcolor="#CCCCFF" font size=1
!width=90| Date
!width=180| Home
!width=60| Score
!width=180| Away
!width=260| Venue
!width=70| Crowd
!width=70| Boxscore

All Star Game

Aussie All Stars

Starters

Reserves

World All Stars

Starters

Reserves

Dunk Competition 
Carlos Powell (New Zealand Breakers)

Most Valuable Player 

Rashad Tucker (Melbourne Tigers) Representing the World All Starts - 21 points, 12 rebounds, 9 assists.

Awards
 NBL Most Valuable Player: Sam Mackinnon, Brisbane Bullets
 Larry Sengstock Medal (GF MVP): Sam Mackinnon, Brisbane Bullets
 Coach of the Year: Joey Wright, Brisbane Bullets
 Best Defensive Player: Sam Mackinnon, Brisbane Bullets
 Rookie of the Year: Joe Ingles, South Dragons
 Most Improved Player: Liam Rush, West Sydney Razorbacks
 Best Sixth Man: Stephen Hoare, Melbourne Tigers

All NBL Team

Philips Player of the Week
Round 1: John Rillie (Townsville Crocodiles)
Round 2: Martin Cattalini (Cairns Taipans)
Round 3: Shawn Redhage (Perth Wildcats)
Round 4: Cortez Groves (Wollongong Hawks)
Round 5: Carlos Powell (New Zealand Breakers)
Round 6: Brad Newley (Townsville Crocodiles)
Round 7 – Carlos Powell (New Zealand Breakers) Named twice
Round 8 – Shawn Redhage (Perth Wildcats) Named twice
Round 9 – Larry Abney (Townsville Crocodiles)
Round 10 – Martin Cattalini (Cairns Taipans) Named twice
Round 11 - John Rillie (Townsville Crocodiles) Named twice
Round 12: - Marquin Chandler (Singapore Slingers)
Round 13 – Carlos Powell (New Zealand Breakers) Named three times
Round 14 - Sam Mackinnon (Brisbane Bullets)
Round 15 - Rosell Ellis (South Dragons)
Round 16 - Ed Scott (Sydney Kings)
Round 17 - Adam Ballinger (Wollongong Hawks)
Round 18 - Chris Anstey (Melbourne Tigers)
Round 19 - Dusty Rychart (Brisbane Bullets)
Round 20 - Chris Anstey (Melbourne Tigers) Named twice
Round 21 - John Rillie (Townsville Crocodiles) Named three times

Philips Player of the Month

September/October: Martin Cattalini (Cairns Taipans)
November – Carlos Powell (New Zealand Breakers)
December - Carlos Powell (New Zealand Breakers) Named twice

Coach of the Month

September/October: Scott Fisher (Perth Wildcats)
November – Joey Wright (Brisbane Bullets)
December - Trevor Gleeson (Townsville Crocodiles)

External links
NBL official website, including live scores and fixtures
International Basketball Federation
AussieBBall

Notes and references

 
Australia,NBL
2006–07 in Australian basketball
2006 in New Zealand basketball
2007 in New Zealand basketball